Chatswood is a railway station located in the Sydney suburb of Chatswood. It is served by Sydney Trains services; the T1 North Shore & Western Line and the T9 Northern Line, and the Sydney Metro's North West Line.

History

Chatswood station opened on 1 January 1890 when the North Shore line opened from Hornsby to St Leonards. An island platform was built on 23 May 1900 and a third dock platform brought into use on 12 July 1919. There was a small goods yard, similar to the one at St Leonards, on the western side of the station, beyond the northern end of the platforms. The dock platform on the eastern side of the station was used for electric parcel-van traffic and also for terminating some services from the city, until these were rescheduled to terminate further along the North Shore line from January 1992. It was removed in October 1994. Until 1958 there was a tram terminus in Victoria Avenue beside the station. The station entrance was later integrated with a shopping centre called The Interchange in the mid-1980s.

With the construction of the Chatswood to Epping line, it was decided to redevelop the station to accommodate Chatswood's new role as a junction station. The original station, as well as the attached bus interchange and shopping centre were demolished in 2005 and a temporary station was opened where the former platform 3 was located. A new western island platform opened in place of the original island platform on 16 October 2006. The eastern island platform opened in 2008. The signal cabin that was located at the northern end of the station building, was saved and has been preserved as part of the bus interchange.

The new station precinct is known as the Chatswood Transport Interchange (CTI) and consists of the railway station, a bus interchange and pedestrian pathways connecting the precinct to the surrounding streets. The CTI was constructed as a Public Private Partnership and was to include a new shopping plaza called Metro Chatswood and three towers. The private developers, CRI Chatswood, went into receivership whilst construction was underway. As a result, the shopping centre remained closed until 2014 and major construction of the towers was delayed for several years.

From 26 May 2019, Chatswood station became the major terminus of the Metro North West Line which replaced the Epping to Chatswood railway line which closed on 29 September 2018. This will, at a later date be extended to Bankstown via the Sydney Harbour Rail Tunnel. This will leave Platforms 1 and 4 the only platforms served by Sydney Trains, while the two terminating roads are used by Metro North West Line.

Station layout

The station consists of two island platforms – a city-bound platform and an outbound platform. The two centre platforms now serve as the terminus of the Sydney Metro Northwest line.  The outer platforms serve the Northern and North Shore lines. A turnback / stabling road is located to the south of the station and is used to terminate some trains from the Sydney Metro.

Access to Chatswood station is provided by a series of pedestrian walkways at three different intersections: Victoria Avenue and Railway Street, Chatswood Mall and Orchard Road, and Post Office Lane and Victor Street. Additional pedestrian entrances are available from Chatswood Central Plaza, adjacent to the north side of the station concourse.

Because the station and tracks are level with the ground, the concourse is actually below street level despite being open-air in nature. The installation of new "jump-proof" opal card ticket barriers in 2018 reduces fare evasion and ensures faster entry into the concourse which features stairs, lifts, and escalators to access the platforms. The station fulfills Sydney Trains' Easy Access criteria.

Services

Chatswood station is served by bus routes operated by Busways, Forest Coach Lines, Hillsbus, Keolis Downer Northern Beaches, Transdev, Transit Systems, and two NightRide routes.

Track layout

References

External links

Chatswood station details Transport for New South Wales
Epping to Chatswood Rail Line Transport Infrastructure Development Corporation
Virtual Tour of the Station Metro Chatswood
Chatswood Transport Interchange CRI
Flickr gallery

Easy Access railway stations in Sydney
Railway stations in Sydney
Railway stations in Australia opened in 1890
Chatswood, New South Wales
Sydney Metro stations
North Shore railway line